A pannier  is a basket, bag, box, or similar container, carried in pairs either slung over the back of a beast of burden, or attached to the sides of a bicycle or motorcycle. The term derives from a Middle English borrowing of the Old French panier, meaning 'bread basket'.

Animal panniers
Traditional panniers for animal transport are typically made of canvas, leather, or wicker. Modern panniers may be rectangular boxes of hard-sided plastic. Panniers are loaded in such a manner as to distribute weight evenly on either side of the animal. For horse packing, and when carrying particularly heavy loads on other animals they are supported by a pack saddle to distribute weight more evenly across the back of the animal. In some cases, additional items are placed on the back of the animal, between the panniers.

Bicycle panniers

There are many styles of bicycle panniers. Touring panniers are usually sold in pairs, intended to hold enough equipment for self-sustained tours over days or weeks. The most common setup is to use a pair of smaller panniers (10 to 15 liters each) mounted on a low rider and a pair of larger ones on the rear carrier (20 to 30 liters each).

Commuters who bicycle have pannier options designed to hold laptop computers, files and folders, changes of clothes or shoes and lunches. There are also panniers that convert to backpacks or shoulder bags for easier carrying when not on a bicycle.

Panniers designed specifically for bicycles were patented by John B. Wood of Camden, New Jersey, in 1884.  Hartley  Alley designed a handlebar bag and other bicycle luggage that he manufactured and sold under the Touring Cyclist brand in the 1970s until his retirement in 1984.

Construction
Bicycle panniers are usually made of nylon or other synthetic fabric that can be stitched, or, in the case of waterproof panniers, welded together.

As bicycles are often ridden in the rain, many panniers are built to be water-repellent or waterproof by themselves. Others include built-in rain-covers, or rain-covers are offered as accessories. The shape of the pannier may be enforced by a frame or stiffening panel made of plastic or metal to help keep it in place and prevent it from contacting a wheel.

Panniers are usually built to attach to a rear rack or front rack already fitted to the bicycle. Removable panniers hook onto the top edge of the rack and are often held in place by a latch or elastic mechanism.

Motorcycle panniers

Motorcycle panniers are generally hard box containers with lids, made of metal or hard plastic. The panniers may be permanently fixed to the motorcycle or may be removable. Soft cases may be leather or fabric, usually without permanent mountings, and are often called saddlebags or 'throwovers'.

See also

 Outline of cycling
 Pannier (clothing)
 Saddlebag
 Pannier Market

References

External links
 

Saddles
Bicycle parts
Luggage